

Events

Pre-1600
46 BC – Julius Caesar fights Titus Labienus in the Battle of Ruspina.
 871 – Battle of Reading: Æthelred of Wessex and his brother Alfred are defeated by a Danish invasion army.

1601–1900
1642 – English Civil War: King Charles I, accompanied by 400 soldiers, attempts to arrest five members of Parliament for treason, only to discover the men had been tipped off and fled.
1649 – English Civil War: The Rump Parliament votes to put Charles I on trial.
1717 – The Netherlands, Great Britain, and France sign the Triple Alliance. 
1762 – Great Britain declares war on Spain, which meant the entry of Spain into the Seven Years' War.
1798 – Constantine Hangerli arrives in Bucharest, Wallachia, as its new Prince, invested by the Ottoman Empire.
1853 – After having been kidnapped and sold into slavery in the American South, Solomon Northup regains his freedom; his memoir Twelve Years a Slave later becomes a national bestseller.
1854 – The McDonald Islands are discovered by Captain William McDonald aboard the Samarang.
1863 – The New Apostolic Church, a Christian and chiliastic church, is established in Hamburg, Germany.
1878 – Russo-Turkish War (1877–78): Sofia is liberated from Ottoman rule.
1884 – The Fabian Society is founded in London, United Kingdom.
1885 – Sino-French War: French troops under General Oscar de Négrier defeat a numerically superior Qing force at Núi Bop in northern Vietnam.
1896 – Utah is admitted as the 45th U.S. state.

1901–present
1903 – Topsy, an elephant, is electrocuted by the owners of Luna Park, Coney Island. The Edison film company records the film Electrocuting an Elephant of Topsy's death.
1909 – Explorer Aeneas Mackintosh of the Imperial Trans-Antarctic Expedition escaped death by fleeing across ice floes.
1912 – The Scout Association is incorporated throughout the British Empire by royal charter.
1918 – The Finnish Declaration of Independence is recognized by Russia, Sweden, Germany and France.
1944 – World War II: Operation Carpetbagger, involving the dropping of arms and supplies to resistance fighters in Europe, begins.
1948 – Burma gains its independence from the United Kingdom, becoming an independent republic. 
1951 – Korean War: Chinese and North Korean forces capture Seoul for the second time.
1956 – The Greek National Radical Union is formed by Konstantinos Karamanlis.
1958 – Sputnik 1, the first artificial Earth satellite, launched by the Soviet Union in 1957, falls to Earth from orbit.
1959 – Luna 1 becomes the first spacecraft to reach the vicinity of the Moon.
1972 – Rose Heilbron becomes the first female judge to sit at the Old Bailey in London, UK. 
1975 – This date overflowed the 12-bit field that had been used in TOPS-10. There were numerous problems and crashes related to this bug while an alternative format was developed. 
1976 – The Troubles: The Ulster Volunteer Force shoots dead six Irish Catholic civilians in County Armagh, Northern Ireland. The next day, gunmen would shoot dead ten Protestant civilians nearby in retaliation.
1987 – The Maryland train collision: An Amtrak train en route to Boston from Washington, D.C., collides with Conrail engines in Chase, Maryland, United States, killing 16 people.
1989 – Second Gulf of Sidra incident: A pair of Libyan MiG-23 "Floggers" are shot down by a pair of US Navy F-14 Tomcats during an air-to-air confrontation.
1990 – In Pakistan's deadliest train accident an overloaded passenger train collides with an empty freight train, resulting in 307 deaths and 700 injuries.
1998 – A massive ice storm hits eastern Canada and the northeastern United States, continuing through January 10 and causing widespread destruction.
1999 – Former professional wrestler Jesse Ventura is sworn in as governor of Minnesota, United States.
2000 – A Norwegian passenger train departing from Trondheim, collides with a local train coming from Hamar in Åsta, Åmot; 19 people are killed and 68 injured in the accident.
2004 – Spirit, a NASA Mars rover, lands successfully on Mars at 04:35 UTC.
  2004   – Mikheil Saakashvili is elected President of Georgia following the November 2003 Rose Revolution.
2006 – Ehud Olmert becomes acting Prime Minister of Israel after the incumbent, Ariel Sharon, suffers a second, apparently more serious stroke. 
2007 – The 110th United States Congress convenes, electing Nancy Pelosi as the first female Speaker of the House in U.S. history.
2008 – A Let L-410 Turbolet crashes in the Los Roques Archipelago in Venezuela, killing 14 people.
2010 – The Burj Khalifa, the current tallest building in the world, officially opens in Dubai.
2013 – A gunman kills eight people in a house-to-house rampage in Kawit, Cavite, Philippines.
2018 – Hennenman–Kroonstad train crash: A passenger train operated by Shosholoza Meyl collides with a truck on a level crossing at Geneva Station between Hennenman and Kroonstad, Free State, South Africa. Twenty people are killed and 260 injured.

Births

Pre-1600
 659 – Ali ibn Husayn Zayn al-Abidin (d.680)
1077 – Emperor Zhezong of China (d. 1100)
1334 – Amadeus VI, Count of Savoy (d. 1383)
1467 – Bodo VIII, Count of Stolberg-Wernigerode (d. 1538)
1581 – James Ussher, Irish archbishop and historian (d. 1656)

1601–1900
1643 (NS) – Isaac Newton, English mathematician and physicist (d. 1726/27)
1654 – Lars Roberg, Swedish physician and academic (d. 1742)
1672 – Hugh Boulter, English-Irish archbishop (d. 1742)
1710 – Giovanni Battista Pergolesi, Italian composer, violinist, and organist (d. 1736)
1720 – Johann Friedrich Agricola, German organist and composer (d. 1774)
1785 – Jacob Grimm, German philologist and mythologist (d. 1863)
1809 – Louis Braille, French educator, invented Braille (d. 1852)
1813 – Isaac Pitman, English linguist and educator (d. 1897)
1832 – George Tryon, English admiral (d. 1893)
1838 – General Tom Thumb, American circus performer (d. 1883)
1839 – Carl Humann, German archaeologist, architect, and engineer (d. 1896)
1848 – Katsura Tarō, Japanese general and politician, 6th Prime Minister of Japan (d. 1913)
1858 – Carter Glass, American publisher and politician, 47th United States Secretary of the Treasury (d. 1946)
1864 – Clara Emilia Smitt, Swedish doctor and author (d. 1928)
1869 – Tommy Corcoran, American baseball player and umpire (d. 1960)
1874 – Josef Suk, Czech violinist and composer (d. 1935)
1877 – Marsden Hartley, American painter and poet (d. 1943)
1878 – A. E. Coppard, English poet and short story writer (d. 1957)
  1878   – Augustus John, Welsh painter and illustrator (d. 1961)
1881 – Wilhelm Lehmbruck, German sculptor (d. 1919)
1883 – Max Eastman, American author and poet (d. 1969)
  1883   – Johanna Westerdijk, Dutch pathologist and academic (d. 1961)
1884 – Guy Pène du Bois, American painter, critic, and educator (d. 1958)
1889 – M. Patanjali Sastri, Indian lawyer and jurist, 2nd Chief Justice of India (d. 1963)
1891 – Edward Brooker, English-Australian sergeant and politician, 31st Premier of Tasmania (d. 1948)
1895 – Leroy Grumman, American engineer and businessman, co-founded Grumman Aeronautical Engineering Co. (d. 1982)
1896 – Everett Dirksen, American politician (d. 1969)
  1896   – André Masson, French painter and illustrator (d. 1987)
1897 – Chen Cheng, Chinese politician, Vice President of the Republic of China (d. 1965)
1900 – James Bond, American ornithologist and zoologist (d. 1989)

1901–present
1901 – C. L. R. James, Trinidadian journalist and theorist (d. 1989)
1902 – John A. McCone, American businessman and politician, 6th Director of Central Intelligence (d. 1991)
1905 – Sterling Holloway, American actor (d. 1992)
1913 – Malietoa Tanumafili II, Samoan ruler (d. 2007)
1916 – Lionel Newman, American pianist and composer (d. 1989)
  1916   – Robert Parrish, American actor and director (d. 1995)
1920 – William Colby, American intelligence officer, 10th Director of Central Intelligence (d. 1996)
1924 – Marianne Werner, German shot putter 
1925 – Veikko Hakulinen, Finnish skier and technician (d. 2003)
1927 – Paul Desmarais, Canadian businessman and philanthropist (d. 2013)
  1927   – Barbara Rush, American actress
1929 – Günter Schabowski, German journalist and politician (d. 2015)
1930 – Sorrell Booke, American actor and director (d. 1994)
  1930   – Don Shula, American football player and coach (d. 2020)
1931 – William Deane, Australian judge and politician, 22nd Governor-General of Australia
  1931   – Nora Iuga, Romanian poet, writer and translator
1932 – Carlos Saura, Spanish director and screenwriter (d. 2023)
1934 – Rudolf Schuster, Slovak politician, 2nd President of Slovakia
1935 – Floyd Patterson, American boxer (d. 2006)
1937 – Grace Bumbry, American operatic soprano
  1937   – Dyan Cannon, American actress, director, producer, and screenwriter
1940 – Gao Xingjian, Chinese novelist, playwright, and critic, Nobel Prize laureate
  1940   – Brian Josephson, Welsh physicist and academic, Nobel Prize laureate
1941 – George P. Cosmatos, Italian-Canadian director and screenwriter (d. 2005)
  1941   – Kalpnath Rai, Indian politician (d. 1999)
1942 – Bolaji Akinyemi, Nigerian political scientist, academic, and politician
  1942   – Jim Downing, American race car driver and inventor
  1942   – John McLaughlin, English guitarist and songwriter 
1943 – Doris Kearns Goodwin, American historian and author
  1943   – Hwang Sok-yong, South Korean author and educator
1944 – Gary Stevens, Australian rugby league player
  1944   – Alan Sutherland, New Zealand rugby player (d. 2020)
1945 – Vesa-Matti Loiri, Finnish actor, musician and comedian (d. 2022)
  1945   – Richard R. Schrock, American chemist and academic, Nobel Prize laureate
1946 – Arthur Conley, American singer-songwriter (d. 2003)
1947 – Chris Cutler, English percussionist, lyricist and music theorist
  1947   – Marie-Thérèse Letablier, French sociologist and academic
1948 – Kostas Davourlis, Greek footballer (d. 1992)
  1948   – Cissé Mariam Kaïdama Sidibé, Malian civil servant and politician, Prime Minister of Mali
1949 – Mick Mills, English footballer and manager
1950 – Khondakar Ashraf Hossain, Bangladesh poet and academic (d. 2013)
1953 – Norberto Alonso, Argentinian footballer
1954 – Rob Kerin, Australian politician, 43rd Premier of South Australia
  1954   – Tina Knowles, American fashion designer, founded House of Deréon
1956 – Ann Magnuson, American actress and performance artist
  1956   – Zehava Gal-On, Israeli politician
  1956   – Bernard Sumner, English singer-songwriter, guitarist, and producer 
1957 – Patty Loveless, American singer-songwriter and guitarist
1958 – Matt Frewer, American-Canadian actor
1960 – Gavin Miller, Australian rugby league player
  1960   – Michael Stipe, American singer-songwriter and producer 
1961 – Sidney Green, American basketball player and coach
1963 – Dave Foley, Canadian comedian, actor, director, and producer
  1963   – Martina Proeber, German diver
1964 – Susan Devoy, New Zealand squash player
  1964   – Adrian Shelford, New Zealand rugby league player (d. 2003)
1965 – Guy Forget, French tennis player
  1965   – Craig Revel Horwood, Australian-English dancer, choreographer, and director
  1965   – Julia Ormond, English actress and producer
1966 – Deana Carter, American singer-songwriter and guitarist
1967 – Johnny Nelson, English boxer and sportscaster
  1967   – David Toms, American golfer and philanthropist
  1967   – David Wilson, Australian rugby player
1969 – Kees van Wonderen, Dutch footballer and manager
1971 – Shane Walker, Australian rugby league player
  1971   – Colin Ward, Australian rugby league player
1973 – Frank Høj, Danish cyclist
1974 – Danilo Hondo, German cyclist	
1975 – Shane Carwin, American mixed martial artist and wrestler
  1975   – Paul Watson, English footballer and physiotherapist
1976 – Ted Lilly, American baseball player
1978 – Dominik Hrbatý, Slovak tennis player
1979 – Shergo Biran, German footballer	
  1979   – Tristan Gommendy, French race car driver
1980 – Miguel Monteiro, Portuguese footballer
  1980   – Justin Ontong, South African cricketer
1982 – Richard Logan, English footballer
  1982   – Danny Sullivan, Australian rugby league player
1984 – Kho Jabing, Malaysian and convicted murderer executed in Singapore (d. 2016)
1985 – Kari Aalvik Grimsbø, Norwegian handball player
  1985   – Gökhan Gönül, Turkish footballer
  1985   – Al Jefferson, American basketball player
1986 – Younès Kaboul, French footballer
  1986   – Andrei Krauchanka, Belarusian decathlete
  1986   – James Milner, English footballer
1987 – Kay Voser, Swiss footballer
1988 – Anestis Argyriou, Greek footballer
  1988   – Maximilian Riedmüller, German footballer
1989 – Graham Rahal, American race car driver
1990 – Iago Falque, Spanish footballer
  1990   – Toni Kroos, German footballer
  1990   – Alberto Paloschi, Italian footballer
1992 – Kris Bryant, American baseball player
1994 – Derrick Henry, American football player
1996 – Jackson Hastings, Australian rugby league player
  1996   – Emma Mackey, French-British actress
  1996   – Jasmine Paolini, Italian tennis player
1997 – Ante Žižić, Croatian basketball player 
1998 – Liza Soberano, Filipina actress
1999 – Nico Hischier, Swiss ice hockey player
  1999   – Jaeman Salmon, Australian rugby league player
2005 – Dafne Keen, British-Spanish actress

Deaths

Pre-1600
 871 – Æthelwulf, Saxon ealdorman
 874 – Hasan al-Askari, eleventh of the Twelve Imams (probable; b. 846)
1248 – Sancho II of Portugal (b. 1209)
1344 – Robert de Lisle, 1st Baron Lisle, English peer (b. 1288)
1399 – Nicholas Eymerich, Catalan theologian and inquisitor
1424 – Muzio Sforza, Italian condottiero
1428 – Frederick I, Elector of Saxony (b. 1370)
1584 – Tobias Stimmer, Swiss painter and illustrator (b. 1539)

1601–1900
1604 – Ferenc Nádasdy, Hungarian noble (b. 1555)
1695 – François-Henri de Montmorency, duc de Luxembourg, French general (b. 1628)
1761 – Stephen Hales, English clergyman and physiologist (b. 1677)
1782 – Ange-Jacques Gabriel, French architect, designed École Militaire (b. 1698)
1786 – Moses Mendelssohn, German philosopher and theologian (b. 1729)
1804 – Charlotte Lennox, English author and poet (b. 1730)
1821 – Elizabeth Ann Seton, American nun and saint (b. 1774)
1825 – Ferdinand I of the Two Sicilies (b. 1751)
1863 – Roger Hanson, American general (b. 1827)
1874 – Thomas Gregson, English-Australian lawyer and politician, 2nd Premier of Tasmania (b. 1798)
1877 – Cornelius Vanderbilt, American businessman and philanthropist (b. 1794)
1880 – Anselm Feuerbach, German painter and educator (b. 1829)
  1880   – Edward William Cooke, English painter and illustrator (b. 1811)
1882 – John William Draper, English-American physician, chemist, and photographer (b. 1811)
1883 – Antoine Chanzy, French general (b. 1823)
1891 – Antoine Labelle, Canadian priest (b. 1833)
1896 – Joseph Hubert Reinkens, German bishop and academic (b. 1821)
1900 – Stanisław Mieroszewski, Polish-born politician, writer, historian and member of the Imperial Council of Austria (b. 1827)

1901–present
1904 – Anna Winlock, American astronomer and academic (b. 1857)
1910 – Léon Delagrange, French pilot and sculptor (b. 1873)
1912 – Clarence Dutton, American geologist and soldier (b. 1841)
1919 – Georg von Hertling, German academic and politician, 7th Chancellor of the German Empire (b. 1843)
1920 – Benito Pérez Galdós, Spanish author and playwright (b. 1843)
1924 – Alfred Grünfeld, Austrian pianist and composer (b. 1852)
1925 – Nellie Cashman, American nurse, restaurateur, entrepreneur, and gold prospector (b. 1845)
1927 – Süleyman Nazif, Turkish poet and civil servant (b. 1870)
1931 – Art Acord, American actor and stuntman (b. 1890)
  1931   – Louise, Princess Royal of the United Kingdom (b. 1867)
1941 – Henri Bergson, French philosopher and academic, Nobel Prize laureate (b. 1859)
1943 – Jerzy Iwanow-Szajnowicz, Greek-Polish swimmer and water polo player (b. 1911)
  1943   – Marina Raskova, Russian pilot and navigator (b. 1912)
1944 – Kaj Munk, Danish playwright and pastor (b. 1898)
1960 – Albert Camus, French novelist, philosopher, and journalist, Nobel Prize laureate (b. 1913)
1961 – Erwin Schrödinger, Austrian physicist and academic, Nobel Prize laureate (b. 1887)
1965 – T. S. Eliot, American-English poet, playwright, and critic, Nobel Prize laureate (b. 1888)
1967 – Donald Campbell, English racing driver and world speed record holder (b. 1921)
1969 – Paul Chambers, American bassist and composer (b. 1935)
1975 – Carlo Levi, Italian painter, author, and activist (b. 1902)
1985 – Brian Horrocks, Indian-English general (b. 1895)
1986 – Christopher Isherwood, English-American author and academic (b. 1904)
  1986   – Phil Lynott, Irish singer-songwriter, bass player, and producer (b. 1949)
1988 – Lily Laskine, French harp player (b. 1893)
1990 – Harold Eugene Edgerton, American engineer and academic (b. 1903)
  1990   – Henry Bolte, Australian politician, 38th Premier of Victoria (b. 1908)
1994 – R. D. Burman, Indian film composer and music director (b. 1939)
1995 – Eduardo Mata, Mexican conductor and composer (b. 1942)
  1995   – Sol Tax, American anthropologist and academic (b. 1907)
1997 – Harry Helmsley, American businessman (b. 1909)
1998 – Mae Questel, American actress (b. 1908)
1999 – Iron Eyes Cody, American actor and stuntman (b. 1904)
2001 – Les Brown, American bandleader and composer (b. 1912)
2004 – Brian Gibson, English director and screenwriter (b. 1944)
  2004   – Joan Aiken, English author (b. 1924)
  2004   – John Toland, American historian and author (b. 1912) 
2005 – Bud Poile, Canadian ice hockey player, coach, and manager (b. 1924)
  2005   – Frank Harary, American mathematician and academic (b. 1921)
  2005   – Humphrey Carpenter, English radio host and author (b. 1946)
  2005   – Robert Heilbroner, American economist and historian (b. 1919)
2006 – Irving Layton, Romanian-Canadian poet and academic (b. 1912)
  2006   – Maktoum bin Rashid Al Maktoum, Emirati politician, 1st Prime Minister of the United Arab Emirates (b. 1946)
  2006   – Milton Himmelfarb, American sociographer, author, and academic (b. 1918)
2007 – Helen Hill, American director and producer (b. 1970)
  2007   – Marais Viljoen, South African politician, 5th State President of South Africa (b. 1915)
2008 – Xavier Chamorro Cardenal, Nicaraguan journalist (b. 1932)
2009 – Gert Jonke, Austrian poet, playwright, and author (b. 1946)
2010 – Johan Ferrier, Surinamese educator and politician, 1st President of Suriname (b. 1910)
  2010   – Tsutomu Yamaguchi, Japanese engineer (b. 1916)
2011 – Coen Moulijn, Dutch footballer (b. 1937)
  2011   – Gerry Rafferty, Scottish singer-songwriter (b. 1947)
  2011   – Salmaan Taseer, Pakistani businessman and politician, 26th Governor of Punjab, Pakistan (b. 1944)
2012 – Eve Arnold, American photographer and journalist (b. 1912)
  2012   – Rod Robbie, English-Canadian architect, designed the Canadian Pavilion and Rogers Centre (b. 1928)
2013 – Anwar Shamim, Pakistani general (b. 1931)
  2013   – Zoran Žižić, Montenegrin politician, 4th Prime Minister of the Federal Republic of Yugoslavia (b. 1951)
2015 – Pino Daniele, Italian singer-songwriter and guitarist (b. 1955)
2016 – S. H. Kapadia, Indian lawyer, judge, and politician, 38th Chief Justice of India (b. 1947)
  2016   – Stephen W. Bosworth, American academic and diplomat, United States Ambassador to South Korea (b. 1939)
2017 – Milt Schmidt, Canadian ice hockey player, coach and general manager (b. 1918)
  2017   – Georges Prêtre, French orchestral and opera conductor (b. 1924)
2019 – Harold Brown, 14th United States Secretary of Defense (b. 1927)
2020 – Tom Long, Australian actor (b. 1968)
2021 – Tanya Roberts, American actress (b. 1949)
2023 – Rosi Mittermaier, German alpine skier and Olympic champion (b. 1950)

Holidays and observances
 Christian feast day:
 Angela of Foligno
 Elizabeth Ann Seton
 Ferréol of Uzès
 Mavilus
 Pharaildis of Ghent
 Rigobert
 January 4 (Eastern Orthodox liturgics)
 The eleventh of the Twelve Days of Christmas. (Western Christianity)
 Independence Day (Myanmar), celebrates the independence of Myanmar from the United Kingdom in 1948.
 Colonial Martyrs Repression Day (Angola)
 Day of the Martyrs (Democratic Republic of the Congo)
 Ogoni Day (Movement for the Survival of the Ogoni People)
Tokyo Dome Show: The annual Wrestle Kingdom event run by New Japan Pro-Wrestling
 World Braille Day

Notes

References

External links

 BBC: On This Day
 
 Historical Events on January 4

Days of the year
January